Andrew Farley (born October 31, 1972) is an American Evangelical Christian, the author of nine best-selling books, including The Naked Gospel and God Without Religion, and the Lead Pastor of The Grace Church, in Dallas, Texas. He served as an Associate Professor of Applied Linguistics at Texas Tech University.

Education 

In 2000, Farley received a Doctor of Philosophy degree from University of Illinois at Urbana–Champaign.

Career 
For a time, Andrew Farley served as an associate professor in linguistics at Notre Dame college.

Now, Farley is an international conference speaker and speaks at churches, conferences, and universities around the United States and in Canada, and has a nationwide call-in program on Sirius XM called The Grace Message with Andrew Farley. He is known as one of the leading voices in the modern grace movement.

Farley is best known for the book The Naked Gospel (Harper Collins, 2009), which made him a bestselling author. Farley’s other books include God Without Religion, Heaven is Now, The Art of Spiritual War, The Hurt & The Healer (co-authored with MercyMe) and Relaxing with God. In addition, Farley co-authored A Climate for Change with his wife Katharine Hayhoe. In 2019, Farley published his lengthiest book to date, Twisted Scripture: Untangling 45 Lies Christians Have Been Told.

His writings have been featured on Fox News, Patheos, PBS, and several Christian networks. In November 2015, he began writing for The Huffington Post.

Since 2015, Farley has served as president of The Grace Message with Dr. Andrew Farley , a non-profit book and media ministry based in Lubbock, TX that carries the tagline, “Jesus plus nothing. 100% natural. No additives.” His favorite Bible verse is Galatians 2:20.
In more recent times, his organization has started another campus of The Grace Church in Dallas, Texas.

He has appeared on several Christian broadcasting networks including TBN's "Praise the Lord,", 100 Huntley Street, Christian Broadcasting Network.

Personal life 

Farley is married to Katharine Hayhoe, an atmospheric scientist.

Books 

 The Naked Gospel. Zondervan. 2009. 
 God without Religion. Baker Publishing Group, 2011. 
 Relaxing with God. Baker Publishing Group, 2014 
 Heaven is Now. Baker Publishing Group, 2014. 
 Operation Screwtape. Baker Publishing Group, 2013. 
 The Hurt and the Healer. with Bart Millard. Baker Publishing Group, 2013 
 Twisted Scripture. Salem Books, 2019. 
 The Perfect You. with Tim Chalas.Salem Books, 2021. 
 The Grace Message. Salem Books, 2022.

References

External links 
 

Living people
American male writers
Texas Tech University faculty
University of Illinois Urbana-Champaign alumni
American evangelicals
1972 births